Fanboy Confessional is a Canadian documentary series exploring fan subcultures. Subjects of the series have included Cosplay, Furries, LARP, Steampunk, and Real-life Superheroes. Created by Toronto based production company Markham Street Films, the series currently airs on Space.

Episodes

External links
 Watch the show online (Canada only)

Notes

CTV Sci-Fi Channel original programming
2010s Canadian documentary television series
2011 Canadian television series debuts
2011 Canadian television series endings